Lebensraum! (German for Living Space) is the fourth studio album by Swedish artist Jonathan Johansson. The album saw its release in March 2015, and was preceded by the single "Ny / Snö" in October 2014. "Alla helveten" and "Lätt att släcka 98" were later released as singles. The album charted at number 28 on the Swedish Albums Chart.

Track listing
All music written by Jonathan Johansson and Johan Eckeborn, except track 4, written by David Lindell and track 6, written by Samuel Starck. All lyrics written by Jonathan Johansson.

Personnel
 Jonathan Johansson – music, lyrics, vocals, guitar, bass, drums, keyboards, synthesizer
 Johan Eckeborn – music, production
 Samuel Starck – music, piano
 David Lindell – music, bass, double bass
 David Lillberg – technician, piano, sampler, synthesizer
 Leo Svensson – cello
 Daniel Kurba – organ
 Stefan Olsson - acoustic guitar
 Henrik Edenhed – mixing
 Tom Coyne – mastering
 Rikkard Häggbom – photography
 Tobias Häggbom – artwork

2015 albums
Jonathan Johansson (musician) albums